Trachymela litigiosa is a species of leaf beetle in the family Chrysomelidae, which was first described in 1877 as Paropsis litigiosa by Félicien Chapuis, from a specimen collected at Port Denison (Sydney).

References

Chrysomelinae
Taxa named by Félicien Chapuis
Taxa described in 1877